Keratin, type I cuticular Ha6 is a protein that in humans is encoded by the KRT36 gene.

The protein encoded by this gene is a member of the keratin gene family. This type I hair keratin is an acidic protein which heterodimerizes with type II keratins to form hair and nails. The type I hair keratins are clustered in a region of chromosome 17q12-q21 and have the same direction of transcription.

References

Further reading